Bulgaria competed at the 1960 Winter Olympics in Squaw Valley, United States.

Alpine skiing

Men

Cross-country skiing 

Men

Women

References
Official Olympic Reports
 Olympic Winter Games 1960, full results by sports-reference.com

1960 in Bulgarian sport
Nations at the 1960 Winter Olympics
1960